The Jerome family is a fictional family from the original ABC Daytime drama General Hospital. The family was first introduced in January 1987. As one of the most powerful families in organized crime, the Jeromes rose to popularity due to their longstanding feud with antihero Duke Lavery and his heroine wife, Anna Devane. However, by the spring of 1990, all of the major family members had been (presumably) killed off of the series. In 2013, the family was revived as part of an ongoing storyline.

Family members

First generation
 Victor Jerome (Jack Axelrod)   Victor was the patriarch of the family and the leader of the Jerome mob. Victor forced Duke Lavery into trying to help him legitimize the mob. However, those plans failed due to the fighting between his children. Victor is the father of Dino Antoinelli, Evan, Julian, Olivia St. John, and Ava. Victor died after Lucy Coe rejected him, and he choked on a piece of jewelry he made for her.

Second generation
 Dino Antoinelli (Chris DeRose)  Victor's illegitimate son with his longtime mistress, Dimitra Antoinelli. Dino was raised by his mother, and eventually went to work for Victor's organization. It was not until 1988 that his paternity was revealed. A bitter Dino tried to kill his half-sister Olivia in an attempt to take over their father's organization for himself. Dino and Dimitra were later sent to prison for their part in Olivia's attempted murder, and Dino rejected Victor when his father came to visit him.
 Evan Jerome, Sr. (Mentioned character)  Evan was the oldest legitimate son of Victor, and considered the black sheep of the family. He married a woman named Veronica and together they had a son, Evan, Jr. In 1983, Evan met Duke Lavery in L'Orlean, Canada during a party at the home of Duke's father, Angus McKay. Evan was killed when he tried to rape Angus's daughter, Camelia. Duke and Angus covered up his murder while Camellia suffered a psychotic break and blocked out the event. Veronica wanted revenge, but Victor put an end to her scheming by banishing her to Europe.
Olivia St. John (Tonja Walker)  Victor's oldest daughter, born Olivia Jerome. She developed an obsession with Duke Lavery, and struggled with her brothers Julian and Dino for control of the family business. She was presumed dead after Julian killed her for betraying him. In 2017, she was revealed to be alive and the Jerome crime boss, looking to get revenge against Julian. She was caught and locked up in D'Archam mental asylum.
Julian V. Jerome (William deVry)  Victor's youngest son, and most favored child. Shielded from the mob while growing up, but later went to work for his father anyway. Julian battled with his siblings for control of the empire, until he was presumed dead. Julian returned to Port Charles in 2013, looking to rebuild the Jerome Family empire with his younger sister, Ava. Julian has three known children: Lucas Jones, Sam McCall, and Leo Falconeri. He was killed by a gunshot during a struggle with Sonny Corinthos.
 Ava Jerome (Maura West)  Victor's illegitimate daughter with Delia Ryan. Ava came to Port Charles in 2013, working with Julian to re-establish the family's power in Port Charles. Ava has two daughters: Kiki Jerome and Avery Corinthos.

Third generation
 Evan Jerome, Jr. (Mentioned character)  Son of Evan Jerome and his wife, Veronica. In 1990, Eric "Edge" Jackson pretended to be Evan Jerome, Jr. According to Victor's will, Evan, Jr. stood to inherit the entire family's estate. With Edge's true identity revealed, Anna Devane learned that the real Evan Jerome was a drug addict who once worked for Edge. The search for the real Evan began, but Edge believed he was already dead. It was later confirmed that Evan Jr. had been killed in a car crash. The diamonds were taken by the IRS to pay Victor's back taxes.
 Samantha "Sam" McCall (Kelly Monaco)  Julian's daughter with Alexis Davis. Sam was taken from a teenage Alexis by Mikkos Cassadine, Alexis' father, and illegally adopted by Cody McCall and Evelyn Bass. Sam didn't find her birth parents until she was an adult. She is the mother of Lila McCall, Danny Morgan, and Scout Morgan.
 Lucas Stansbury Jones (Matt Trudeau)  Julian's son with Cheryl Stansbury. He was sold on the black market by Victor shortly after birth, and illegally adopted by Bobbie Jones, who names him after her brother Luke Spencer. When Cheryl finds out the truth, she gets Lucas back. When Cheryl dies, Lucas is briefly taken in by his aunt Tiffany Hill, before being legally adopted by Bobbie and her then husband Tony Jones. Julian didn't meet Lucas until he was an adult, and the two built a tentative relationship, but Lucas struggled to trust Julian.
 Lauren Katherine "Kiki" Jerome (Hayley Erin)  Ava's daughter with Dr. Silas Clay. However, Kiki was raised as the daughter of the crazed artist Franco. Kiki has struggled to trust her mother, simultaneously loving and hating Ava for lying and hurting her several times. She was murdered by Ryan Chamberlain.
 Avery Corinthos  Ava's daughter with Sonny Corinthos. Avery is stolen at birth by Nina Clay, who skips town with the baby and makes plans to raise the baby as her own. Avery was rescued, and briefly lived with her brother, Michael Corinthos. Avery has been the subject of a bitter custody battle between her parents.
 Leo Falconeri Julian's son with Olivia Falconeri. Olivia claimed that Ned Ashton was his father, to keep Julian away. Olivia and Ned faked Leo's death, and took a prematurely born Leo to upstate New York for treatment, to keep him hidden from Julian. Olivia returned, and claimed Leo was a child she adopted. Julian eventually found out the truth, and they worked out a custody arrangement, though Olivia is still reluctant to let Julian spend time with Leo.

Fourth generation
 Lila McCall  Sam's daughter with Sonny Corinthos. She was stillborn on November 8, 2004 after Sam collapsed while arguing with Alexis Davis. Her stem cells were donated to save Kristina Davis. Sam intended to name her Lila after Lila Quartermaine, but the baby was buried as "Baby Girl McCall."
 Daniel Edward "Danny" Morgan  Sam's son with Jason Morgan. He is named after Sam's adoptive brother, Danny McCall and Jason's grandfather, Edward Quartermaine. He was switched at birth with Victor Lord III, but was eventually reunited with his parents.
 Emily Scout Cain  Sam's daughter with Drew Cain, born onscreen February 28, 2017. She is named after Drew's adoptive sister, Emily Quartermaine.

In-Laws
 Veronica Jerome (Robyn Millan) - Evan, Sr's wife (19??–83)
 Jason Morgan (Steve Burton) - Sam's husband (2011–18)
Morgan Corinthos (Bryan Craig) - Kiki's husband (2013)
Alexis Davis (Nancy Lee Grahn) - Julian's wife (2016)
Brad Cooper (Parry Shen) - Lucas' husband (2016–20)
Drew Cain (Cameron Mathison) - Sam's husband (2018)
Nikolas Cassadine (Marcus Coloma) - Ava's husband (2020—)
Nelle Benson (Chloe Lanier) - Julian's wife (2020)

Family tree
Legend

Descendants

 Victor Jerome (1928–89); married Unnamed woman (deceased)
 Dino Antoinelli; Victor's son with Dimitra Antoinelli
 Evan Jerome (died 1983); Victor's oldest son with his wife; married Veronica Jerome
 Evan Jerome, Jr. (deceased); Son of Evan and Veronica.
 Olivia St. John (1960–); Victor's daughter with his wife
 Julian Jerome (1961–2020); Victor's youngest son with his wife; married Alexis Davis (2016, divorced), Nelle Benson (2020, widowed)
 Sam McCall (1980–); Julian and Alexis' daughter; married Jason Morgan (2011–18, divorced), Drew Cain (2016–18, divorced)
 Lila McCall (2004); Sam's daughter with Sonny Corinthos
 Danny Morgan (2012–); Sam and Jason's son
 Scout Cain (2017–); Sam and Drew's daughter
 Lucas Jones (1987–); Julian's son with Cheryl Stansbury; married Brad Cooper (2016–20, divorced)
 Wiley Cooper-Jones (2018); Lucas and Brad's adoptive son
 Leo Falconeri (2015–); Julian's son with Olivia Falconeri
 Ava Jerome (1974–); Victor's daughter with Delia Reid; married Nikolas Cassadine (2020–)
 Kiki Jerome (1993–2018); Ava's daughter with Silas Clay; married Morgan Corinthos (2013, annulled)
 Avery Jerome Corinthos (2014–); Ava's daughter with Sonny Corinthos

References

General Hospital families
General Hospital characters
Television characters introduced in 1987